Molly O'Neill (9 Oct 1952, Columbus, Ohio - 16 Jun 2019) was an American food writer, cookbook author, and journalist, perhaps best known for her food column in the New York Times Sunday Magazine and Style section throughout the 1990s.

Molly O'Neill was born and grew up in Columbus, Ohio, the only girl in a family with five brothers born to Charles and Virginia O'Neill. In her 2006 memoir, she describes the family's strong interest in baseball. Her father had been a minor league pitcher before working for North American Aviation and later running an excavation business. Her younger brother Paul O'Neill, became an outfielder for the Cincinnati Reds and the New York Yankees. Molly's early exposure to cooking came from making dinner for her brothers, at times surreptitiously to circumvent "healthier" dinners left for the children by their mother.

O'Neill earned a bachelor's degree from Denison University in Granville, Ohio, and then moved to Northampton, Massachusetts where she and eight other women opened a feminist cooperative restaurant. She studied cooking formally for eight weeks at l'École de Cuisine La Varenne, one of the first cooking schools in Paris to offer instruction in both English and French. After moving to an Italian restaurant in Boston, Ciro & Sal's, she was recognized by Boston Magazine as best female chef in 1982.

O'Neill wrote articles on food for The Boston Globe and Boston magazine, and in 1985 was hired by Donald Forst to write for New York Newsday. In 1990, she moved to the New York Times, where she wrote a food column for their Sunday Magazine and Style section for a decade. During that time, she published a number of influential articles, including a widely read piece noting that salsa had displaced ketchup as the most popular condiment in the United States, and exploring the cultural implications of that fact.

For many years, O'Neill lived in Rensselaerville, New York, where she hosted students for summer writing workshops as part of a program she founded called CookNScribble. She moved back to New York City as her health declined. In July 2016, O'Neill experienced liver failure. In October 2016, she received a liver transplant, but it was later discovered that her original liver had had cancerous cells that had metastasized to her adrenal glands. Her friend the writer Anne Lamott organized a fundraiser to help cover the costs of her medical care. O'Neill died of complications of metastatic cancer in June 2019.

Selected bibliography

The New York Cookbook (1992) 
 "New Mainstream: Hot Dogs, Apple Pie and Salsa" The New York Times (11 Mar 1992) 
A Well-Seasoned Appetite: Recipes From an American Kitchen (1995)
The Pleasure of Your Company: How to Give a Dinner Party Without Losing Your Mind (1997) 
 "Food Porn." Columbia Journalism Review. (01 Sep 2003) 
Mostly True: A Memoir of Family, Food, and Baseball (2006) New York, NY: Scribner. 
One Big Table: A Portrait of American Cooking (2010)
American Food Writing: An Anthology with Classic Recipes Molly O'Neill, ed. (2007) New York, NY: Library of America

See also

 List of American print journalists
 List of people from New York City

References

7. https://www.forbes.com/sites/cathyhuyghe/2019/06/23/when-your-mentor-dies-a-tribute-to-molly-oneill-and-what-she-taught-me-about-wine-writing/?sh=2f78a2344dd9

External links
  Obituary at the New York Times.
  Obituary at the Washington Post.
  Tribute at Saveur Magazine.
  Tribute at Forbes Magazine.
 Interview of Molly O'Neill by Nancy Rommelman of Portland Food and Drink

1952 births
2019 deaths
20th-century American non-fiction writers
American autobiographers
American cookbook writers
American magazine writers
American restaurant critics
People from Columbus, Ohio
The New York Times columnists
American women columnists
Writers from Ohio
Writers from New York City
Critics employed by The New York Times
James Beard Foundation Award winners
20th-century American women writers
21st-century American women